Rhododendron primuliflorum is a species of flowering plant in the genus Rhododendron native to central China. It has gained the Royal Horticultural Society's Award of Garden Merit.

References

primuliflorum
Endemic flora of China
Plants described in 1891